Die schöne Lurette is an East German film. It is an adaptation of the opéra comique Belle Lurette] by Jacques Offenbach. It was released in 1960, and sold 3,267,070 tickets.

References

External links
 

1960 films
East German films
1960s German-language films
Operetta films
Films based on operettas
Films set in the 1760s
Films set in Paris
Films directed by Gottfried Kolditz
1960 musical films
1960s German films